The Ministers of Social Protection of Armenia:

Introduction 

In 1990, Armenia's Ministry for Social Security was reorganized into the Ministry of Labor and Social Security. On February 28, 2000 according to President’s decree, the Ministry was merged into the Ministry of Health and Social Security. On May 20, 2000 according to President’s decree, the Ministry was separated as the Ministry of Social Security. On December 25, 2003 pursuant to President’s decree, it was renamed the Ministry of Labor and Social Affairs.

Ministers

References

 http://www.gov.am/en/structure/16/

 
Lists of government ministers of Armenia